In enzymology, a trimetaphosphatase is an enzyme that catalyzes the chemical reaction

trimetaphosphate + H2O  triphosphate

Thus, the two substrates of this enzyme are trimetaphosphate and H2O, whereas its product is triphosphate.

This enzyme belongs to the family of hydrolases, specifically those acting on acid anhydrides in phosphorus-containing anhydrides.  The systematic name of this enzyme class is trimetaphosphate hydrolase. This enzyme is also called inorganic trimetaphosphatase.  This enzyme participates in pyrimidine metabolism.

References

 
 

EC 3.6.1
Enzymes of unknown structure